Anna L. Cunningham may refer to:

Pen name for Ada Langworthy Collier
Pen name for Ruth Crowley and then Eppie Lederer